Nyqwan Murray (born July 28, 1997) is an American football wide receiver who is a free agent.

Early years
Murray played high school football at Oak Ridge High School in Orlando, Florida.

College career
Murray played college football at Florida State. During the 2016 Orange Bowl against Michigan, Murray caught a 92-yard touchdown pass from Deondre Francois, an Orange Bowl record for longest touchdown reception.

Professional career

Seattle Seahawks 
After going undrafted in the 2019 NFL Draft, Murray participated in the Seattle Seahawks rookie minicamp, and later signed with the team on August 1, 2019, but was waived five days later. He was re-signed on August 27, 2019. He was waived a second time on September 1, 2019.

Toronto Argonauts 
Murray was signed by the Toronto Argonauts of the Canadian Football League (CFL) on December 4, 2019. He signed a contract extension with the team on December 29, 2020. On July 27, 2021, Murray was released by the Argonauts.

Jacksonville Sharks 
Murray was signed to the Jacksonville Sharks of the National Arena League on December 10, 2021. He was named 2022 All-NAL First-team Offense.

St Louis BattleHawks 
On January 1, 2023, Murray was selected by the St. Louis BattleHawks in the 13th round of the 2023 XFL Supplemental Draft.

References 

1997 births
Living people
Players of American football from Orlando, Florida
Players of Canadian football from Orlando, Florida
American football wide receivers
Florida State Seminoles football players
Seattle Seahawks players
Toronto Argonauts players
Jacksonville Sharks players
St. Louis BattleHawks players